The Fison Baronetcy, of Greenholme in Burley-in-Wharfedale in the West Riding of the County of York, is a title in the Baronetage of the United Kingdom. It was created on 27 July 1905 for Frederick Fison, Conservative Member of Parliament for Doncaster from 1895 to 1906.

Fison baronets, of Greenholme (1905)

Sir Frederick William Fison, 1st Baronet (1847–1927)
Sir Francis Geoffrey Fison, 2nd Baronet (1873–1948)
Sir (William) Guy Fison, 3rd Baronet (1890–1964) Olympic rower 1912
Sir (Richard) Guy Fison, 4th Baronet (9 January 1917 – 1 October 2008) - a Master of Wine (M.W.)
Sir Charles William Fison, 5th Baronet (born 1954)

Notes

References
Kidd, Charles, Williamson, David (editors). Debrett's Peerage and Baronetage (1990 edition). New York: St Martin's Press, 1990,

External links
Obituary of Sir Richard Guy Fison in The Times

Fison